The Whole Nine Yards is a 2000 American crime comedy film directed by Jonathan Lynn and distributed by Warner Bros. It was written by Mitchell Kapner and stars Bruce Willis, Matthew Perry, Amanda Peet, Michael Clarke Duncan, and Natasha Henstridge. Its story follows a mild-mannered dentist as he travels to Chicago to inform a mob boss about the whereabouts of his new neighbor, a former hitman with a price on his head.

The film was produced by Morgan Creek Productions, Franchise Pictures, Rational Packaging, and Lansdown Films and was released on February 18, 2000. The film received mixed reviews from critics and grossed $106 million. A sequel, The Whole Ten Yards, was released in 2004.

Plot
Nicholas "Oz" Oseransky is a likable Quebec dentist from Chicago, but is hated by his wife Sophie and mother-in-law. Oz's assistant Jill jokingly asks him to name a price to have Sophie disappear. Oz meets a new neighbor, and realizes he is Jimmy "the Tulip" Tudeski, an infamous Chicago contract killer with a bounty on his head.

Oz reveals Jimmy's identity to Sophie, who is intrigued. Oz befriends Jimmy, and shares his unhappiness: his business partner, Sophie's father, was involved with an underage boy and embezzled from the practice to pay off the boy's family before committing suicide, leaving Oz deeply in debt. Oz returns home, where Sophie has arranged for him to fly to Chicago and share Jimmy's whereabouts with mob boss Janni Gogolak for a reward. Oz is reluctant but complies.

Arriving in Chicago, Oz has no intention of giving Jimmy up. At his hotel, he meets Franklin "Frankie Figs" Figueroa, Janni's enforcer, and denies any knowledge of Jimmy, but is brought to Janni's estate. He meets Cynthia, Jimmy's estranged wife. Janni instructs Frankie to accompany Oz home and keep an eye on Jimmy until Janni and his men can take him out. At the hotel, Oz calls Jimmy to warn him, but is told Jimmy knows what Oz has done. Cynthia arrives and tells Oz that Janni and Jimmy both want each other and Cynthia dead to collect a $10 million trust – "the whole nine yards." Oz and Cynthia drunkenly sleep together, and he vows to protect her.

In Canada, Frankie and Oz meet Jimmy, who reveals he and Frankie are planning to kill Janni and Cynthia. Jimmy explains Sophie tried to hire him to kill Oz, and he plans to lure Janni to Montreal. Jimmy offers to kill Sophie, which Oz declines. At work, Oz tells Jill everything. She reveals that she too is a contract killer, hired by Sophie to kill Oz, Jill liked him too much, however, and cancelled the hit. She demands to meet her hero, Jimmy, who enlists her help. Oz tries to call Cynthia, who is en route with Janni. When Janni's gang arrives at Oz's house, Cynthia warns Oz that Janni will kill him after killing Jimmy. The two watch as the gang walks into the ambush.

Down the street, Sophie meets with another hitman, but when he recognizes Janni and Sophie explains the situation, he heads for the house with a gun, taking the car keys with him. Inside, Janni is distracted by a naked Jill; she, Jimmy and Frankie kill Janni and his men. Oz and Cynthia drive away as Jimmy also shoots Sophie’s hitman, much to Sophie's horror, and discovers he is an undercover Sûreté du Québec detective. As they dispose of the bodies, Oz calls and suggests a deal to benefit everyone. At his office, he alters the dead detective's teeth to match Jimmy's dental records, then sets his and Janni’s bodies on fire in Oz's car. Investigators find the remains and believe Janni and Jimmy are dead, and, while heading to Jimmy’s house with the intent to arrest him, discover a recorder in the detective’s car; Sophie’s conversation about killing Oz sends her and her mother to prison, despite Sophie's claim that Jill is the real killer. Oz is cleared of suspicion, and Cynthia collects the $10 million, transferring it to Jimmy in exchange for her and Oz's lives.

While Cynthia and Jill, who have just met face-to-face, are at the bank, Jimmy and Frankie take Oz onto a yacht. Jill urges Cynthia to split the money with her and run, leaving Oz to be killed by Jimmy, but Cynthia realizes she loves Oz and refuses to betray him, and Jill assures her it was a test; Jimmy wants to give Cynthia and Oz $1 million as a wedding gift.

On the boat, Jimmy confirms that the money has been transferred. He points a gun at Oz, but shoots Frankie instead, explaining that Frankie, believing Jimmy had gone soft, would have killed them both. Oz attributes the softness to Jimmy falling in love. Jill arrives and jumps into Jimmy's arms and, before he and Jill leave, Jimmy tells Oz to say hello to his widow for him. Oz, ignorant of the $1 million, asks Cynthia to marry him and she accepts. Later, the happy couple dances above Niagara Falls.

Cast

Production
In April 1999, it was announced Matthew Perry would star alongside Bruce Willis in the Franchise Pictures-produced film. Matthew Perry filmed the movie during summer hiatus of Friends between Seasons 5 and 6.

Reception

Box office
The Whole Nine Yards grossed $57.3 million in the United States and Canada, and $49.1 million in other territories, for a worldwide total of $106.4 million.

The film grossed $13.4 million in its opening weekend, finishing second at the box office. It then made $9.6 million in its sophomore weekend and $7.2 million in its third.

Critical response
On Rotten Tomatoes the film has an approval rating of 43% based on 104 reviews, with an average rating of 5.2/10. The website's critics consensus reads: "Despite a charming cast, The Whole Nine Yards can't tickle funny bones consistently enough to distract from its sitcom-like story." Metacritic gives the film a weighted average score of 47 out of 100, based on 32 critics, indicating "mixed or average reviews". Audiences polled by CinemaScore gave the film an average grade of "B" on an A+ to F scale.

Roger Ebert gave the film one of the more positive reviews, noting in particular that the highlight was Amanda Peet's performance as Jill, which Ebert called "perfect".

Sequel

A critically panned sequel with most of the original cast titled The Whole Ten Yards was released on April 9, 2004. Unlike the original film, the sequel was rated PG-13 instead of R.

References

External links

 
 
 
 
 
 

2000 films
2000s adventure comedy-drama films
2000 crime films
2000s crime comedy-drama films
2000 romantic comedy-drama films
American adventure comedy-drama films
American crime comedy-drama films
American romantic comedy-drama films
2000s English-language films
2000s French-language films
2000s Spanish-language films
Films set in Chicago
Films set in Montreal
Films shot in Chicago
Films shot in Montreal
Films shot in Ontario
Films about dentistry
Mafia comedy films
Morgan Creek Productions films
Films directed by Jonathan Lynn
Franchise Pictures films
Films scored by Randy Edelman
Warner Bros. films
2000s American films